Double Eleven Limited is a British video game developer and video game publisher based in Middlesbrough. It was founded by former Rockstar Games developers Lee Hutchinson and Matt Shepcar in June 2009.

History
In 2010, they began working on an undisclosed title with Sony Computer Entertainment Europe, revealed at E3 2011 to be LittleBigPlanet for PlayStation Vita. In 2011, they joined the trade association TIGA. Between 2011 and 2012, Double Eleven were contracted to work exclusively with Sony Computer Entertainment Europe. During this time, they opened an additional studio in Leeds, West Yorkshire.

In 2013, they announced that they are working on a remake of Frozen Synapse - originally by Mode 7 Games - for the PlayStation Vita and PlayStation 3, entitled 'Frozen Synapse: Tactics'. After finishing PixelJunk Shooter Ultimate for PS4 and Vita in June 2014, development for FS: Tactics quickly took off and by 5 September 2014 it took on a new name of Frozen Synapse Prime along with a release date of 24 September 2014 for the PlayStation Vita. Two months later it was released on the PlayStation 3 and Windows.

In August 2014, at Gamescom 2014, it was announced that they were working on the next PixelJunk game, Nom Nom Galaxy for the PlayStation 4 and PlayStation Vita and Goat Simulator for Xbox One and Xbox 360. Goat Simulator was released in April 2015.

In February 2016, it was announced that Shahid Ahmad, who had headed up PlayStation's strategic content division in the UK for many years, had joined the board of Double Eleven in an advisory capacity.  "Shahid's role in elevating independent games as a whole to the mainstream audience is remarkable, so it's a great honor to have his guidance as Double Eleven continues to grow in the games space." said COO, Mark South.

In 2017, Double Eleven announced they were releasing two new titles, Super Cloudbuilt by Coilworks (PlayStation 4, Xbox One and Steam) and Songbringer by Wizard Fu Games (PlayStation 4, Xbox One and Windows 10), which released between July and September. Double Eleven received recognition from GamesIndustry.biz, named one of the 'Best Places To Work 2017'. The company was also featured in The Sunday Times Tech Track 100, placing at number 42 out of 100 with a sales rise of 92.32% over three years.

In 2019, Double Eleven announced their acquisition of VooFoo Studios. Based in Birmingham, UK, and developer of Hustle Kings (PlayStation 3, PlayStation 4 and PlayStation Vita), the official purchase on 1 December 2018 included multiple intellectual properties, including the announced This Is Pool and This is Snooker with Stephen Hendry (coming to Nintendo Switch, PlayStation 4, Xbox One and Steam) and their proprietary Mantis Engine which recently powered 2016's Mantis Burn Racing. On 20 June 2019, it was announced that Double Eleven had partnered with Paradox Interactive to become the new lead developer of Prison Architect, previously Introversion Software, for Microsoft Windows, MacOS, Linux, PlayStation 4, Xbox One and Nintendo Switch. Double Eleven have previous experience with the game and initially ported and updated the title for all major consoles. Double Eleven have subsequently announced their involvement in Mojang's Minecraft Dungeons and that they will be publishing Facepunch Studios' Rust on Xbox One and PlayStation 4.

Double Eleven announced in January 2020 that they will be opening a second office in Kuala Lumpur, Malaysia as to gain an in-roads into the Asian marketplace.

On March 28, 2022, Double Eleven announced their collaboration with Bethesda Game Studios to develop content for Fallout 76 later in the year.

Awards

Games

References

External links 
 .

Video game companies of the United Kingdom
Video game development companies
British companies established in 2009
Video game companies established in 2009
Companies based in Middlesbrough
2009 establishments in England
Video game publishers